Patrick Henry Flaherty  (January 31, 1866 – January 28, 1946) was a Major League Baseball third baseman who played with the Louisville Colonels in 1894. His minor league career stretched from 1887 though 1900, mostly in the Texas League and Western Association.

External links
  Baseball-Reference

1866 births
1946 deaths
Louisville Colonels players
19th-century baseball players
Major League Baseball third basemen
Baseball players from Missouri
Houston Babies players
Houston Red Stockings players
New Orleans Pelicans (baseball) players
Houston Mud Cats players
Sacramento Senators players
La Grande Grand Rhonders players
Spokane Bunchgrassers players
Houston Mudcats players
Waco Tigers players
Galveston Sand Crabs players
Chattanooga Warriors players
Charleston Seagulls players
Milwaukee Brewers (minor league) players
Memphis Giants players
Memphis Lambs players
Rockford Forest City players
Rockford Reds players
Quincy Bluebirds players
Quincy Little Giants players
Peoria Blackbirds players
Rockford Forest Citys (minor league) players
Dubuque Tigers players
Ottumwa Giants players
Port Huron Tunnelites players
Houghton Giants players
Seattle Hustlers players